Khushal is a given name in Persian, Pashto and Hindi meaning "happy".

Places 
 Khushal, Gilan, a village in Iran
 Khushal, Mazandaran, a village in Iran
 Khushal Sar, a lake in Jammu and Kashmir, India
Khushal Khan Mena, suburb in Kabul, Afghanistan

People 
 Khushal Khan Gunsamundra, 17th-century musician at the Mughal court
 Khushal Singh, nawab of Singhpuria, Punjab 1753–1795
 Khushal Singh, thakur of Awa, Rajasthan and active during the 1857 Erinpura revolt
 Khushal Bopche (born 1951), Indian politician

See also 
 Kushal (disambiguation)